Stitches is a 2012 comedy slasher film directed by Conor McMahon and written by McMahon and David O'Brien. It stars Ross Noble, Tommy Knight and Gemma-Leah Devereux, with Shane Murray Corcoran, Thomas Kane Byrne, Eoghan McQuinn, Roisin Barron, Hugh Mulhern, John McDonnell, Tommy Cullen, Lorna Dempsey, Jemma Curran, and Ryan Burke in supporting roles. The plot concerns a birthday clown returning from the dead to exact revenge upon a boy and a group of children/teenagers who contributed to his death.

The film was produced by Fantastic Films and Tailored Films in 2012 and marks the film debut of Tommy Knight and stand-up comedian Ross Noble.

The film is an international co-production between Ireland, Sweden, and the United Kingdom. McMahon began working on the film after receiving a €600,000 grant from the Irish Film Board, also utilising funding from MEDIA Europe. Filming for the movie took place in Ireland.

Stitches premiered in Dublin, Ireland in September 2012 and was theatrically released in the United Kingdom on 26 October 2012.

Plot
Richard Grindle, a clown with the stage name "Stitches", is having sex with a woman in his camper. During intercourse, she notices an egg encased in a glass tube with a face painted on it. Stitches explains that "they" made him do it when he signed up. Stitches arrives late at Tommy's tenth birthday party. He attempts to entertain the children, but they instead ridicule him. Tommy's best friend Vinnie ties Stitches' shoelaces together, and Tommy throws a soccer ball on his face, causing him to trip and land on a kitchen knife on the other side of the room, unseen to the children, which penetrates his face. As the children come to find out, Stitches slowly gets up, revealing the knife lodged in his eye. Seeing him, all of the kids scream in terror and run away. However, Tommy stays; when Stitches removes the knife, blood gushes out of his head. After it stops bleeding, he attempts to stab Tommy, only to slip on a puddle of blood. Stitches falls on the floor as the knife falls into his eye a second time, killing him. Tommy visits Stitches' grave to put a squeaky flower on top, only to find a group of clowns entering an abandoned building. Tommy enters the building to find the clowns performing a ritual with Stitches' egg. One member discovers Tommy and brings him to the cult's leader, The Motley. The Motley warns to Tommy that a clown who dies and never finishes the party will never rest in peace, and a joke is not as funny the second time.

Six years later, Tommy is preparing for his sixteenth birthday. He is still haunted by the memory of his past birthday, and begins to have frightening hallucinations, such as a teacher turning into a clown and ripping off Vinnie's genitals before tying them to a party balloon. Hesitating at the idea of throwing a large party, he considers instead inviting only a few friends. Ultimately, he settles on a large gathering, and Vinnie secretly distributes many more invitations over the Internet. Tommy, Vinnie, Richie and Bulger, all of whom had been present when Stitches died, prepare the house. As the guests, including Tommy's childhood crush Kate, arrive for the party, Stitches comes back to life and leaves his grave.

Tommy, startled by Paul dressed as a clown, injures his head. Bulger goes to find Tommy a first-aid kit, while Tommy retreats to his treehouse followed by Kate. There, Tommy discusses his memories of the ritual he had encountered as a child. Meanwhile, Paul is attacked by Stitches, who rips off his ear and one of his arms and pulls a live rabbit out of his throat before kicking his head off. The clown then finds Bulger, opens up his skull with a can opener, and removes his brain with an ice cream scooper. Sarah, Paul's girlfriend, enters the attic to look for him. There, she is attacked by Stitches, and manages to fight back. As she tries to escape, Stitches drives an umbrella through her skull, killing her. Through his telescope, Tommy sees Stitches in the house, and goes to warn Vinnie of his presence, but is at first unsuccessful, due to Vinnie's desire to have sex with a formerly overweight classmate. Tommy tries to warn Kate and the other partygoers, but they don't believe him.

Outside, Stitches attacks Richie. Richie attempts to flee but trips and falls. Stitches rips out his intestines and fashions them into a balloon animal before stabbing him with a bike pump and inflating him. Stitches manages to pump enough air into Richie to cause his head to explode. Vinnie, on discovering Tommy to be telling the truth, attempts to leave, but Stitches attacks them. Tommy stabs him, Vinnie covers him with a blanket, and they escape. Tommy and Vinnie rescue Kate, but Stitches knocks her unconscious as they attempt to escape. Tom tries to resuscitate her, and Vinnie leaves them behind, and Stitches attempts to drown Tommy in a sink that Vinnie had previously vomited in. Kate awakens and throws a knife at Stitches, while Tommy deduces a manner in which to defeat the clown; to kill him, they must destroy the egg he kept in his van. Tommy and Kate, pursued by Stitches, make their way to the den in the graveyard. While hiding, Tommy begins to hiccup, and Kate kisses him in order for him to stay quiet. Tommy searches for Stitches' egg among a collection of them while Kate keeps an eye out for Stitches, but the pair are soon discovered by him. While deciding which of the two to kill, Vinnie ties Stitches' shoelaces together again. He trips and drops his egg. Tommy forces Stitches to smash the egg, and Stitches explodes in a mixture of magic trick supplies and yolk.

Six months later, Tommy has moved to a new house and is dating Kate. While the couple are in Tommy's old treehouse, Kate gives Tommy a new telescope, and his old one is positioned so as to focus on the den in the graveyard. There, The Motley is attempting to piece Stitches' broken egg back together. The egg is now fully restored indicating that Stitches will return. After the film cuts to black, Stitches' catchphrase, "Everybody happy?", is heard.

Cast

 Tommy Knight as Tommy 
Ryan Burke as Young Tommy, 10 years old
 Ross Noble as Richard "Stitches" Grindle
 Gemma-Leah Devereux as Kate 
 Shane Murray Corcoran as Vinnie 
 Thommas Kane Byrne as Bulger 
 Eoghan McQuinn as Richie
 Roisin Barron as Sarah 
 Hugh Mulhern as Paul 
 John McDonnell as The Motley 
 Tommy Cullen as Dan 
 Lorna Dempsey as Mary
 Jemma Curran as Jenny

Production

McMahon began working on Stitches after receiving a €600,000 grant from the Irish Film Board, also utilizing funding from MEDIA Europe. Filming for the movie took place in Ireland.

Soundtrack

The score was composed by Paul McDonnell. "Dream Conjecture" was written and performed by Jonathan van Atom. The film's soundtrack also features the 1986 song "(I Just) Died in Your Arms" by the English rock band Cutting Crew. The party scene also features the song "Funk Epidemic", written by Danny Groenland, Conor Doherty and Ken McCabe and performed by Irish group Mob Fandango.

Release
Stitches premiered in Dublin, Ireland in September 2012. It received a limited theatrical release in the U.S. under the distributor Dark Sky Films, and in Japan under Shochiku. The Japanese title of the film translates as The Dead Clown Goes Mad. In France, the film's title is Dark Clown.

Reception

Critical reception
Starburst rated it 6/10 stars. Entertainment.ie rated it three stars and commented on the influence of "80s slasher flicks" on the film.  Bloody Disgusting wrote that the film was "destined to become a cult classic" and carried "heavy replay value". Dread Central in particular praised the film's kill scenes, calling them "brilliant" and remarking that they were done "with such a rigorous sense of care and detail". Criticisms for the movie revolved around the film being "an incredibly low budget production" and the plot being "nowhere near as fun as it sounds on paper". Screen Daily commented that the "horror stuff is obvious, but staged with showstopping flair and buckets of blood".

Awards

References

External links
 
 
 
 Tailored Films Website

2012 films
2012 comedy horror films
2010s supernatural horror films
British comedy horror films
British slasher films
British films about revenge
English-language Irish films
English-language Swedish films
Films set in 2006
Films set in 2012
Films shot in Ireland
Horror films about clowns
Irish comedy horror films
Irish supernatural horror films
Irish slasher films
British splatter films
British supernatural horror films
Swedish comedy horror films
Swedish slasher films
British ghost films
Slasher comedy films
Supernatural slasher films
Supernatural comedy films
British exploitation films
2010s slasher films
2010s exploitation films
2010s English-language films
2010s British films
2010s Swedish films